Ernie Page may refer to:

 Ernie Page (politician) (1935–2018), Australian politician
 Ernie Page (athlete) (1910–1973), English athlete